1931 Emperor's Cup Final was the 11th final of the Emperor's Cup competition. The final was played at Meiji Jingu Gaien Stadium in Tokyo on October 31, 1931. Tokyo Imperial University LB won the championship.

Overview
Tokyo Imperial University LB won their 1st title, by defeating Kobun Junior High School 5–1.

Match details

See also
1931 Emperor's Cup

References

Emperor's Cup
1931 in Japanese football